Bobby Olivero (born December 24, 1946, Lakewood, California), is a former driver in the USAC Championship Car series.  He raced in the 1976-1978 seasons, with 17 career starts, including the 1977 Indianapolis 500.  He finished in the top ten 11 times, with his best finish in 5th position in 1977 at Ontario.

In 1979, Olivero was the USAC Silver Crown Series champion.  Earlier in his career, he won the 1975 CRA season championship.

Complete USAC Championship Car results

Complete PPG Indy Car World Series results

External links
Driver Database Profile

1946 births
Living people
Champ Car drivers
Indianapolis 500 drivers
People from Lakewood, California
Racing drivers from California
USAC Silver Crown Series drivers